Mount Roland is a locality, a mountain, and a conservation area in the north west coast region of Tasmania, Australia.

The mountain is near the town of Sheffield. There are long established walking tracks from both Claude Road and Gowrie Park to the summit.

A Mount Roland cable car has been proposed for the mountain on several occasions. The local community remains divided over the suitability or desirability of a cable car.

The locality of Mount Roland is a rural locality in the local government areas of Meander Valley and Kentish in the Launceston and North and north-west regions of Tasmania. The 2016 census has a population of nil for the state suburb of Mount Roland.
Mount Roland is a confirmed locality.

The Mersey River forms part of the southern boundary. The Mount Roland Conservation Area occupies a small area in the north of the locality.
Route C136 (Claude Road) runs through the north-east corner of the locality. Route C138 (Olivers Road) enters from the north-west and runs south until it exits.

There was a death near the summit in 2015; a senior South Australian health official is alleged to have murdered his wife. The official later killed himself while he was in the Risdon jail.

See also

 List of highest mountains of Tasmania

References

Localities of Kentish Council
Localities of Meander Valley Council
Towns in Tasmania
Conservation areas of Tasmania